Raja Kaiya Vacha is a 1990 Indian Tamil-language comedy film, directed by Suresh Krissna. The film stars Prabhu, Revathi and Gautami with Nassar, Sarathkumar, Nagesh, Janagaraj, Anandaraj, and Poornam Viswanathan in supporting roles. It was released on 7 December 1990.

Plot 
Raja is a con artist who falls in love with Vijaya. First, she thinks that he was a police officer and asks him to find lost belongings. However, Raja steals to fulfill her wishes. One day, the police arrests Raja in front of Vijaya. Raja is sent to jail but is welcome like a king in jail. Vijaya leaves the town with her father. When Raja is released, he decides to find Vijaya.

Meanwhile, Johnny, a worker union leader, often strikes and works with a competitor company manager named Vaidyaraj. Many general manager of the company resigned, so Raja tries to get the job to see Vijaya, who also works there. The company chairman engages Raja, who in turn engages his friend Japan as a company security officer. Divya, the company chairman's granddaughter and a polio patient, falls in love with Raja. The strikes and workers problem within the company begins to disappear, and Vaidaraj gets furious.

Vijaya begins to understand Raja's heart. Divya's grandfather proposes to Raja to marry her, but Raja says that he is in love with Vijaya. Johnny and Vaidaraj plan to kill Raja, so they put a bomb in the factory. Vaidyaraj reveals that he is the brother of the company chairman. He and Johnny eventually get killed. Finally, Raja saves the factory and marries Vijaya.

Cast 

 Prabhu as Raja
 Revathi as Divya
 Gautami as Vijaya
 Nassar as Johnny
 Sarathkumar as Vaidyaraj
 Anandaraj as Japan
 Nagesh as Vijaya's father
 Janagaraj as Raghu
 Poornam Viswanathan as the company chairman and Divya's grandfather
 Ponnambalam as Goon
 Suresh Krissna
 Charle in a guest appearance
 G. Venkateswaran as himself (guest appearance)
 Laxman Sivaramakrishnan as himself (guest appearance)

Soundtrack 
The soundtrack was composed by Ilaiyaraaja, with lyrics written by Vaali, Pulamaipithan, Kanmani Subbu and Piraisoodan. The song "Mazhai Varudhu" is based on Bageshri raga.

Reception 
N. Krishnaswamy of The Indian Express wrote, "The film has a classy look, but in the quest for comedy, director Suresh Krishna seems to have taken the story line rather too lightly". C. R. K. of Kalki wrote the earlier parts of the film had youthful factor; following the strike at the car factory, the story began to strike and gradually succumbed to the formula and slipped away.

References

External links 
 

1990 comedy films
1990 films
1990s Tamil-language films
Films about con artists
Films directed by Suresh Krissna
Films scored by Ilaiyaraaja
Films set in Bangalore
Indian comedy films